Rachid Azzedine is a French boxer. At the 2012 Summer Olympics, he competed in the Men's lightweight, but was defeated in the first round.

References

Living people
Olympic boxers of France
Boxers at the 2012 Summer Olympics
Lightweight boxers
1982 births
French male boxers